Survivor: Nicaragua is the 21st season of the American CBS competitive reality television series Survivor. It premiered on September 15, 2010 at 8:00pm, moving to the Wednesday timeslot for the first time since Survivor: Borneo. Applications were due in January 2010, filming started from June and ended in July 2010. Nicaragua and the following season, Survivor: Redemption Island, were filmed near San Juan del Sur in Rivas Department on the Pacific coast of Nicaragua.

This season's opening titles uses the original version of "Ancient Voices" — Survivors opening theme song — first used for the debut Survivor season. Traditionally, each season features its own version of "Ancient Voices", using instruments and sounds meant to evoke that season's location or theme. One was created for Nicaragua but was not used, though the song was released onto iTunes on October 10. The reason for this omission has not been publicly disclosed. Survivor host Jeff Probst also announced that the Hidden Immunity Idol will continue to be used in the game. However, as idols had been found too easily in the past two seasons, the idol was hidden differently. The clues to the idols' locations were rebuses rather than text as in past seasons. In addition, the tribes vied for control of a new item, the Medallion of Power, which offered an advantage to the tribe who held it at a challenge, but should they use the Medallion, it went to the other tribe for the next challenge. This season also marked the return of the tribal swap, which was absent in the previous three seasons. When the tribal swap occurred in episode 5, the Medallion of Power was retired.

This was the second season in which tribes were divided by age, the first one being Survivor: Panama. Jud "Fabio" Birza was named the winner in the final episode on December 19, 2010, defeating Chase Rice and Matthew "Sash" Lenahan in a 5–4–0 vote. Birza became the youngest person to ever win the game, at age 21 years and 6 months. This was the first Survivor season to have an all-male final three. Jane Bright won $100,000 as the "Sprint Player of the Season."

Contestants
 

The cast is composed of 20 players, initially splitting into two tribes based on their ages containing 10 members each. The tribes are Espada, contestants aged 40 and over; and La Flor, contestants aged 30 and younger. Their names come from the Spanish words "sword" and "flower", respectively. The merged tribe Libertad means "liberty" or "freedom" in Spanish, which was first suggested by contestant Marty Piombo.

Notable contestants this season include Kelly Bruno, a triathlete whose leg was amputated at six months old because of a birth defect, Chase Rice, who became a country music artist after the season aired, and former Dallas Cowboys coach Jimmy Johnson. Bruno is the second Survivor contestant to be an amputee, the first being Chad Crittenden of Survivor: Vanuatu, who lost his right leg to cancer.

Future appearances
Brenda Lowe returned to compete on Survivor: Caramoan as a member of the "Favorites" tribe.

Outside of Survivor, Lowe appeared as one of the 26 models for Howie Mandel's show Deal or No Deal.

Season summary
Twenty new castaways were divided into tribes by age: La Flor, which consisted of castaways 30 and younger, and Espada, which consisted of castaways 40 and older. Both tribes also vied for ownership of the newly-introduced Medallion of Power, which granted them advantages either at camp or when played in challenges. Every time a tribe used its power, ownership of the Medallion would shift to the other tribe.

Several members of the older Espada tribe vied for leadership. While Jimmy J. initially took control, he was quickly overthrown by Marty and voted out. Marty furthered his control of the tribe by finding the Hidden Immunity Idol and voting out aspiring leader Jimmy T. Despite dominating the challenges in the first eleven days of the game, the younger La Flor tribe also had their own share of conflicts. Two warring alliances emerged, one led by Shannon and the other led by Brenda, with both alliances vying for Chase's vote. A confused Shannon lashed out at La Flor's first Tribal Council, causing Chase and some of Shannon's own alliance members to vote him out. 

A tribe swap on Day 12 caused allegiances to shift. Alina, Benry, Chase, and NaOnka moved to Espada, while Marty, Jill, and Jane moved to La Flor. At the new Espada, Holly and Dan aligned themselves with the younger members. At the new La Flor, the once-powerful Marty fell from grace, and Jane teamed up with the original La Flor tribe members. Brenda planned to split the vote between Marty and original La Flor outsider Kelly B. in order to flush Marty's idol and send Kelly B. home. Unfortunately for them, Marty decided not to use his idol and Kelly B. was sent home anyway, while Marty still had his immunity idol. Sash told Marty that in order to remain in the game, he must give him his idol. Marty complied, and Sash stayed true to his word by keeping him around, only to send Jill, Marty's closest ally, home instead.

On Day 19, the two tribes were merged into the Libertad tribe. Brenda's original La Flor alliance regrouped, with the addition of Holly and Jane. Marty, however, convinced Dan, Benry, and Fabio to follow him. Without any alliances, Alina was targeted by both voting blocs and sent to the jury first. Marty then tried to form an all-male rebellion against the females, which did not work and sent him home instead. It seemed that Brenda and Sash were in total control of the tribe, but Holly made her own move by turning everybody else on Brenda. Brenda put her faith wholly in her alliance without attempting to plead with them, but they ultimately eliminated her. Meanwhile, while the tribe was at a challenge, their unattended fire ignited their cache of food and supplies, burning them and part of their tarp. The remaining tribe members struggled with the meager rations.

With Brenda gone and the sudden voluntary exits of Kelly S. and NaOnka as a result of the camp fire, Sash was left alone without any allies, but eventually regained power by winning the next Immunity Challenge, becoming the swing vote between Holly, Chase and Jane's alliance and the alliance of Dan, Fabio and Benry. Sash joined Chase, Holly and Jane to eliminate an unsuspecting Benry, whom Sash saw as the bigger threat. The newly formed majority alliance planned to eliminate Fabio next, but he went on to win individual immunity. While Dan was the only non-immune of the minority alliance, Chase, Holly and Sash decided to turn on jury threat Jane, and voted her out instead. Fabio won immunity again and Dan was voted out, but after Fabio won his third successive immunity challenge, Chase and Sash decided to turn on Holly, whom they thought had the best chance to win the game against them.

At the Final Tribal Council, the jurors made it clear they would not vote for Sash for his numerous lies and deceptions. Chase was blasted for his inability to make strategic and social decisions, and Fabio was accused of being clueless about what was going on, not voting in the majority many times. Chase was praised however for his honesty, performing well in team challenges, and making relationships with people. Fabio said he was open with everyone, and intentionally was strategically clueless because he didn't want to hurt or play with anyone's emotions. Because of this, Fabio's unique strategy earned him the votes of five jurors, to Chase's four and Sash's zero.

In the case of multiple tribes or castaways who win reward or immunity, they are listed in order of finish, or alphabetically where it was a team effort; where one castaway won and invited others, the invitees are in brackets.

Episodes

Voting history

Reception
Survivor: Nicaragua was heavily panned by critics and fans, and is often considered to be one of the worst seasons in the series. Survivor columnist Dalton Ross of Entertainment Weekly ranked Nicaragua as the second-worst season of the entire series, only better than Island of the Idols, for four reasons: "1) Splitting the tribes up by age and the Medallion of Power were both enormous flops. 2) Like One World, Thailand and Fiji, just too many unlikable players. 3) Two people quitting with only 11 days left. 4) No big memorable moments. Even Thailand had the fake merge and Fiji had the big Yau-Man/Dreamz free car deal gone bad, but what was Nicaraguas signature moment? Unfortunately, it was people quitting, and that was memorable for all the wrong reasons." This season was similarly ranked as the second-worst by Inside Survivor in 2020 due to underwhelming gameplay, pointless twists, and an unlikeable cast. Nicaragua was ranked as the worst season by fan site "The Purple Rock Podcast" in 2020, describing it as having "terrible casting, a terrible gimmick, and a terrible winner," combined to make "a truly horrendous Survivor viewing experience." In 2015, a poll by Rob Has a Podcast ranked rank 27th out of 30 with Rob Cesternino ranking it at number 23. This was updated in 2021 during Cesternino's podcast, Survivor All-Time Top 40 Rankings, ranking 34th. The gameplay of winner Jud "Fabio" Birza also received very negative reception. Birza placed last out of the first 34 winners in a fan poll conducted by Entertainment Weekly in 2017 and also received the most last-place and second-to-last-place votes out of every winner in the poll - by a wide margin.

When Jimmy Fallon, a longtime fan of the show interviewed Jeff Probst on Late Night with Jimmy Fallon, he said that he was disappointed with this season and called it a popularity contest. Probst felt that Nicaragua was boring, and was the motivating factor that led the producers and himself to add the "Redemption Island" twist for the following season (which would fare even worse than Nicaragua due in no small part to the twist). Nicaragua is ranked as the third-worst season of the series by Examiner.com (only ahead of Gabon and Fiji), and the fourth-worst season by The Wire (only ahead of Samoa, Gabon, and Redemption Island). In 2012, when Survivor fan site "Survivor Oz" held its first annual poll ranking every season of the series (up to that point), Nicaragua was ranked as the second-worst season of the series, only ahead of Redemption Island. 

In the official issue of CBS Watch magazine commemorating the 15th anniversary of Survivor, Probst stated that Nicaraguas tribe division by age "is a division I hope we never do again," (however, 6 years later, Survivor: Millennials vs. Gen X saw a similar division) and also called the Medallion of Power "one of the worst named and most poorly executed twists we’ve ever come up with [and] embarrassing on all accounts."

References

External links
 Official CBS Survivor Nicaragua Website

21
2010 American television seasons
Rivas Department
2010 in Nicaragua
Television shows filmed in Nicaragua